This article lists various songs, albums, festivals, and performances of the year 2014 in Irish music.

Albums/Songs

January

February
Heartbeat (Can-linn song) was released on February 21. It appeared at the Eurovision Song Contest 2014 in Denmark.

March

April
In April, Jedward's single "Free Spirit" was released

May

June

July

August

September
The Coronas's fourth album will be released sometime in September.

October

November

December

Performances/Festivals
Bold indicates that the event occurs in multiple months.

January

February
Ireland in the Eurovision Song Contest 2014 took place on February 28.

March

April

May

June
Lismore Music Festival took place on May 31 and June 1 in Lismore Castle

July
Live at the Marquee will take place from June 21 to July 15.

August
Castlepalooza will take place from August 1–3.
Indiependence, an indie-rock festival, will take place from August 1 to 3 in Mitchelstown, County Cork.
Electric Picnic, an arts and music festival, will take place from August 29–31.

September
Harvest Time Blues will take place from September 5 to 7 in Monaghan town.

October
Cloughtoberfest, a gypsy jazz festival held in Cloughjordan, County Tipperary October 10 to 12.

November

December

News
Emmet Cahill announced that he will be leaving Celtic Thunder in January.

Deaths
Finbarr Dwyer, accordion player, died aged 67 on February 8.
Seán Potts, Irish musician (The Chieftains), died aged 83 on February 11.
Paddy McGuigan, songwriter who wrote ("The Men Behind the Wire", "The Boys of the Old Brigade") and musician (The Barleycorn), died aged 74 on March 17.

See also
2014 in music
Music of Ireland

References

External links 
 Irish Music Awards
 IMRO website
 IRMA website
 Hot Press website
 Music at The Irish Times
 Music at the Irish Independent
 Music news and album reviews at RTÉ